Lotella is a genus of morid cods.

Species
The currently recognized species in this genus are:
 Lotella fernandeziana Rendahl (de), 1921
 Lotella phycis (Temminck & Schlegel, 1846) (beardie)
 Lotella rhacina (J. R. Forster, 1801) (rock cod)
 Lotella schuettei Steindachner, 1866 (slender beardie)
 Lotella tosaensis (Kamohara, 1936)

References

Moridae